Hating Kapatid is a 2010 Filipino comedy-drama film produced and released by Viva Films. The film is about two sisters, Rica (Judy Ann Santos) and Cecil (Sarah Geronimo), and how the return of their Overseas Filipino Worker parents change their sibling relationship.

Plot summary
Rica (Judy Ann Santos) has been very protective of her sister Cecil (Sarah Geronimo) even giving up her one true love Bong (JC de Vera) for her sisters future and after a freak accident 8 years ago at their little party store for fireworks, but as they grow up under the care of their grandmother (Gina Pareño) their parents come back (Tonton Gutierrez and Cherry Pie Picache). As they come back the girls are all grown up and Rica fears that her younger sister, Cecil, will no longer need her to look after her. Cecil later on meets and later falls in love with Edzel (Luis Manzano).

Cast
Judy Ann Santos as Rica
Sarah Geronimo as Cecil/Cecilia
JC De Vera as Bong
Luis Manzano as Edzel
Vice Ganda  as Beauty
Gina Pareno as Lola Gerty/Amor
Cherry Pie Picache as Mother of Rica & Cecil
Tonton Gutierrez as Father of Rica & Cecil
DJ Durano as Noel
Joseph Andre Garcia as Joseph
Mariel Pamintuan as Young Rica
Angel Sy  as Young Cecil
Marjorie Joven as 3 Year Old Cecil
Ricky Rivero as Doctor
Joy Viado† as Alahera
Tess Antonio as Candy
Cacil
Atak
Empoy Marquez

Reception

Box-office
The film opened with a ₱11 million gross. The film earned P 82 million in its entire run.

International screenings
The film had international screenings in select cities in the United States such as San Francisco, CA, San Diego, CA, New York City, NY, and Honolulu, HI. Also in countries such as Austria, Switzerland, Spain, Dubai, Guam, and Canada.

References

External links
 Official website

2010 films
Philippine comedy-drama films
2010s Tagalog-language films
Viva Films films
Films directed by Wenn V. Deramas